Norris Reef is a reef lying close off the western shore of the island of Bouvetøya, 0.5 nautical miles (0.9 km) southwest of Cape Circoncision. First charted in 1898 by a German expedition under Carl Chun. Recharted in December 1927 by a Norwegian expedition under Captain Harald Horntvedt. Named by the Norwegians after British sealer Captain George Norris who, commanding the sealers  Sprightly and Lively, visited Bouvetoya in 1825.

References

Other sources
Simpson-Housley, Paul  (2002)	Antarctica: Exploration, Perception and Metaphor	(Routledge) 

Reefs of Bouvet Island